The Gangshan Refuse Incineration Plant is an incinerator in Gangshan District, Kaohsiung, Taiwan.

History
The construction of the plant was completed in February 2001 led by Takuma Co. Ltd. and China Steel.

Technical details
The plant can treat 1,350 tons of garbage per day and produce 912 MWh of electricity per day and run by Taiwan Sugar Corporation. As of 2020, it received a total of 31,324 tons of garbage annually and incinerated 33,026 tons of them.

Transportation
The plant is accessible northwest of Gangshan Station of Taiwan Railways.

See also
 Air pollution in Taiwan
 Waste management in Taiwan

References

2001 establishments in Taiwan
Incinerators in Kaohsiung
Infrastructure completed in 2001